This is a list of Japan women's international footballers – Japanese association football players who have played for the Japan women's national football team as recorded by the Japan Football Association.

Players

See also

Japan
Women's
 International footballers
 National football team (Results)
 National under-20 football team
 National under-17 football team
 National futsal team
Men's
 International footballers
 National football team (Results (2020–present))
 National under-23 football team
 National under-20 football team
 National under-17 football team
 National futsal team
 National under-20 futsal team
 National beach soccer team

External links
Japan Football Association 

 
Japan
Association football player non-biographical articles